Mariana Berumen Reynoso (born October 30, 1991) is a Mexican model and beauty pageant titleholder who won the title of "Nuestra Belleza Mundo México" at the Nuestra Belleza México 2011 pageant.

Born in Jalostotitlán, Jalisco and moved to León, Guanajuato from an early age, Reynoso was chosen to represent her country in the 62nd Miss World pageant in 2012 during the 2011 edition of Nuestra Belleza México, held August 20, 2011 in Puerto Vallarta, Jalisco. The pageant was won by Aguascalientes's Karina González. Berumen was crowned Nuestra Belleza Mundo México by the outgoing titleholder Gabriela Palacio.

References

1991 births
Living people
Top Model finalists
Nuestra Belleza México winners
Miss World 2012 delegates
Models from Guanajuato
People from León, Guanajuato